The Men's Scratch Race event at the 2010 South American Games was held on March 20.

Medalists

Results

Distance: 60 laps (15 km)
Elapsed time: 19:28.109
Average Speed: 46.228 km/h

References
Report

Track cycling at the 2010 South American Games
Men's scratch